Julie "Giulietta" Guicciardi (23 November 178422 March 1856) was an Austrian countess and briefly a piano student of Ludwig van Beethoven. He dedicated to her his Piano Sonata No. 14, later known as the Moonlight Sonata.

Life 
Julie Guicciardi, as she was named by her family, was born in Przemyśl, Austrian Poland. Her parents were Count Franz Joseph Guicciardi and Countess Susanna von Brunswik. She arrived in Vienna with her parents from Trieste in June 1800, and her beauty caused her to be noticed by high society. She was soon engaged to Count von Gallenberg (1780–1839), an amateur composer, whom she married on 14 November 1803. Subsequently, they moved to Naples. She returned to Vienna in 1822. In later years, Count Hermann von Pückler-Muskau was among her admirers.

She died in Vienna in 1856.

Connection with Beethoven 
Beethoven became acquainted with Guicciardi through the Brunsvik family (often known in English as "Brunswick"). He was particularly intimate with her cousins, the sisters Therese and Josephine Brunsvik (whom he had taught the piano since 1799). In late 1801, he became Guicciardi's piano teacher, and apparently became infatuated with her. She is probably the "enchanting girl", about whom he wrote on 16 November 1801 to his friend Franz Gerhard Wegeler: "My life is once more a little more pleasant, I'm out and about again, among people – you can hardly believe how desolate, how sad my life has been since these last two years; this change was caused by a sweet, enchanting girl, who loves me and whom I love. After two years, I am again enjoying some moments of bliss, and it is the first time that – I feel that marriage could make me happy, but unfortunately she is not of my station – and now – I certainly could not marry now."

In 1802, he dedicated to her (using the Italian form of her name "Giulietta Guicciardi" to conform with the conventions of dedications) the Piano Sonata No. 14, which although originally titled Sonata quasi una Fantasia (like its companion piece, Piano Sonata No. 13 in E-flat major) subsequently became known by the popular nickname Moonlight Sonata. This dedication was not Beethoven's original intention, and he did not have Guicciardi in mind when writing the Moonlight Sonata. Thayer, in his Life of Beethoven, states that the work Beethoven originally intended to dedicate to Guicciardi was the Rondo in G, Op. 51 No. 2, but this had to be dedicated to Countess Lichnowsky. So he cast around at the last moment for a piece to dedicate to Guicciardi.

In 1823, Beethoven confessed to his then-secretary and later biographer Anton Schindler, that he was indeed in love with her at the time. In his 1840 Beethoven biography, Schindler claimed that "Giulietta" was the addressee of the letter to the "Immortal Beloved". This notion was instantly questioned (though not in public) by her cousin Therese Brunsvik: "Three letters by Beethoven, allegedly to Giulietta. Could they be a hoax?" Therese's doubts were well-founded because, unlike Schindler and other contemporaries, she knew all about the intense and long-lasting romance between Beethoven and her sister Josephine: "Three letters by Beethoven ... they must be to Josephine whom he had loved passionately."

In the 1994 film Immortal Beloved, Countess Guicciardi is played by Valeria Golino.

References

Sources
 
 
 
 
 
 
 
 

1784 births
1856 deaths
People from Przemyśl
Countesses from the Austrian Empire